Pernice is an Italian surname meaning "partridge".

Notable people with this surname include:

 Erich Pernice (1864–1945), German classical archaeologist
 Gino Pernice (1927–1997), Italian stage, television and film actor
 Giovanni Pernice (born 1990), Italian dancer and choreographer
 Hugo Karl Anton Pernice (1829-1901), German gynecologist
 Joe Pernice (born 1967), American musician
 Tom Pernice Jr., American golfer